James Alan Anderson was the chancellor of Fayetteville State University (beginning 2008), where he was also a professor of psychology.

Biography
Anderson was raised in Washington, D.C. He received an undergraduate degree in psychology from Villanova University in 1970, and earned a doctoral degree in psychology from Cornell University in 1980.

Career
Chairman of the Department of Psychology 1976–1983, Xavier University of Louisiana, New Orleans
Professor of Psychology 1983–1992 Indiana University of Pennsylvania
Vice Provost for Undergraduate Affairs 1992–2003, North Carolina State University
Vice President and Associate Provost for Institutional Assessment and Diversity 2003–2005, Texas A&M University
Vice President for Student Success and Vice Provost for Institutional Assessment and Diversity 2005–2008, University at Albany, SUNY
Chancellor and Professor of Psychology 2008–2019, Fayetteville State University

Books

The Unfinished Agenda: Brown v. Board of Education (2004) 
Driving Change through Diversity and Globalization-Transformative Leadership in the Academy (2007)

References

External links
Speech by James A. Anderson at the Fourth National Conference on Black Student Retention on KUT's "In Black America" radio series, December 6, 1988 at the American Archive of Public Broadcasting

Villanova University alumni
Cornell University alumni
Xavier University of Louisiana faculty
Indiana University of Pennsylvania faculty
North Carolina State University faculty
Texas A&M University faculty
University at Albany, SUNY faculty
Living people
Year of birth missing (living people)